George C. Boniface (November 3, 1832 – January 3, 1912) was an American actor.  He made his professional debut in Baltimore in 1851, and remained in the profession for sixty years.  Among his best-known roles was as Rodolphe in the original production of The Black Crook (1866).  One of his last appearances was in New York with Ethel Barrymore in Mid-Channel in 1909.

Boniface had three children: Stella Weaver, John D., and George C. Boniface Jr.  Stella and George Jr. were also accomplished actors.

Boniface's first wife was Margaret Newton (1840–1883).

References

External links
 

1832 births
1912 deaths
19th-century American male actors
American male stage actors